J. J. McCoy may refer to:
 J. J. McCoy (racing driver), American racing driver 
 J. J. McCoy (rugby union) (born 1958), former Irish rugby union player